Kleidi may refer to the following places in Greece:

Kleidi, Arta, a village in the municipality of Georgios Karaiskakis, Arta regional unit
Kleidi, Boeotia, a village in the municipality of Tanagra, Boeotia
Kleidi, Florina, a village in the municipality of Amyntaio, Florina regional unit
Kleidi, Imathia, a village in the municipality of Alexandreia, Imathia
Kleidi, a site near Samikon